David Lennard is a footballer who played as a midfielder in the Football League for Bolton Wanderers, Halifax Town, Blackpool, Cambridge United, Chester, Stockport County, Bournemouth and Los Angeles Aztecs.

References

1944 births
Living people
Footballers from Manchester
Association football midfielders
English footballers
English expatriate footballers
Bolton Wanderers F.C. players
Halifax Town A.F.C. players
Blackpool F.C. players
Cambridge United F.C. players
Chester City F.C. players
Stockport County F.C. players
AFC Bournemouth players
Salisbury City F.C. players
Los Angeles Aztecs players
English Football League players
North American Soccer League (1968–1984) players
English football managers
Salisbury City F.C. managers
Expatriate soccer players in the United States
English expatriate sportspeople in the United States